Soviet Union women's national softball team is the national team for the Soviet Union.  A representative for the team attended the 1990 ISF Women's World Championship in Normal, Illinois in advance of plans to compete at the next World Championships.

References

External links 
 International Softball Federation

Softball
Women's national softball teams
Softball in the Soviet Union
Women's sport in the Soviet Union